Joshua Swain may refer to:
Joshua Swain (New Jersey politician)
Joshua Swain Jr., son of the New Jersey politician

See also
Joshua Swann, North Carolina politician